Venda do Pinheiro was a freguesia in the municipality of Mafra outside Lisbon in Portugal.

History 
The town was affected by a wildfire on 31 July 2022.

References 

Freguesias of Mafra, Portugal
Former parishes of Lisbon